BNS Uttal  is a Type 024 Missile Boat of the Bangladesh Navy. The ship served Bangladesh Navy from 1992 to 2017.

Career
BNS Uttal was commissioned on 23 August 1992. In Exercise Sea Thunder 2014, Uttal fired a SY-1 missile. She was decommissioned from the Bangladesh Navy on 30 March 2017. Later on she was scrapped.

Design
The ship carries two SY-1 anti-ship missiles and also two Type 61 25 mm (II x 2) guns. For surface search, she has a Type 352 Square Tie Radar.

See also
List of active ships of the Bangladesh Navy
BNS Durbar 
BNS Duranta 
BNS Durvedya 
BNS Durdam

References

Ships of the Bangladesh Navy
Missile boats of the Bangladesh Navy